Anna Madara Pērkone (born 18 July 1994), known professionally as Annna (stylized in all caps), is a Latvian singer, songwriter and music producer based in Amsterdam, Netherlands. Environmental sustainability, burnouts and dysfunctional families are major themes in her songs, and she only wears sustainable or second-hand clothing on stage.

Career

Early career 
Originally from Saulkrasti Municipality in Latvia, Pērkone moved to the Netherlands at the age of 17 to study Diplomacy and Law at Maastricht University. During her studies years, she also did a year long exchange program in Australia where she started to join several jam sessions in the evenings. After her studies, she worked at several advertising agencies in Amsterdam while doing music on the side. As a member of the Amsterdam-based electropop band Madara, she recorded an EP while on tour in Colombia. When she returned, Pērkone decided to pursue a solo career as ANNNA.

In 2019, she released three singles: "Swim", "The One That Got Away" and "Stardom/Hater". In August 2019, Pērkone was the opening act for the American singer LP at a concert in Sigulda. She subsequently gained popularity in Latvia, and her single "The One That Got Away" reached number one in the top 50 most-played songs on radio station Star FM. With the track "Stardom/Hater", she won the 24th edition of Demolition, a competition held at the 2019 Amsterdam Dance Event.

2020: Supernova 

In late 2019, Pērkone submitted the song "Polyester" to Supernova, the Latvian national selection for the Eurovision Song Contest 2020 to be held in Rotterdam, Netherlands. In January 2020, it was announced that she and 25 other acts had been shortlisted from the 126 entries received by the Latvian broadcaster LTV. She survived a second elimination round and proceeded to the final on 8 February 2020, where she finished third out of nine finalists.

Discography

Extended plays

Singles

External links 
 Official website

References 

1994 births
Living people
Latvian expatriates in the Netherlands
21st-century Latvian women singers
Latvian record producers
Latvian songwriters
English-language singers from Latvia